Fankhauser Reserve is a multi-sports venue in Southport, a suburb in the Gold Coast, Australia.

It has been used by the NEAFL's Southport Australian Football Club team as their home game base. The Gold Coast Suns reserves side also occasionally uses the ground for home matches. The ground was due to host a match for premiership points in the 2020 AFL Women's season but it was cancelled due to COVID-19.

In 1987 the Southport Sharks' board of directors submitted a proposal to the local council to build a professional Australian rules football ground and licensed club on the 31 acres of land located on the corner of Musgrave and Olsen Avenues. The submission was approved and the Sharks were granted a 50-year lease on the site. Construction of the $2.7 million development began in 1988 and was completed in February 1989. The ground was named after then Sharks vice president Wally Fankhauser who donated $2.2 million towards the new headquarters.

See also

 Sports on the Gold Coast, Queensland

References

External links

Australian rules football grounds
Cricket grounds in Australia
Sports venues on the Gold Coast, Queensland
Southport, Queensland
North East Australian Football League grounds
Victorian Football League grounds